Marius Sabaliauskas (born 15 November 1978 in Kaunas) is a former Lithuanian cyclist. He ended his career early in 2006 at the age of 28.

Palmares
1999
Clásica Memorial Txuma

2000
2nd stage Vuelta a Navarra
Giro del Canavese

2003
2nd overall Giro dell'Appennino

2004
3rd overall Rund um Hainleite

Results on the grand tours

Tour de France
2004:42nd

Giro d'Italia
2002: DNF
2003: 48th
2005: 66th

Vuelta a España
2004: 87th

References

1978 births
Living people
Lithuanian male cyclists